Baffle or baffles may refer to:

 Baffle (liquid mixing), auxiliary devices employed in tank which suppress the effects of slosh dynamics
 Baffle (heat transfer), a flow-directing or obstructing vane or panel used in some industrial process vessels (tanks)
 Baffle (medicine), a tunnel or wall surgically constructed within the heart or primary blood vessels to redirect blood flow
 Baffles (submarine), the blind spot in a submarine's sonar created by the body of the submarine
 Baffle or All-Star Baffle, a 1973–74 revival of PDQ (game show), where contestants had to guess phrases from a short combination of letters
 Baffle gate, another name for turnstile
 Baffle (camera), shroud protecting the optics of an imaging system from being disturbed from stray light
 Sound baffle, any object designed to reduce airborne sound
 Components in a loudspeaker enclosure used to negate the out-of-phase sound waves from the rear of the loudspeaker
 Components in a suppressor used to redirect the gas from a gunshot to minimise sound and light